Below are the results of the fourth season of the Asia Pacific Poker Tour.  All currencies are US dollars unless otherwise stated.

Events

APPT Manila
 Casino: Hyatt Hotel & Casino Manila
 Buy-in: $2,700
 6-Day Event: Mar 20-25, 2010
 Number of buy-ins: 430
 Total Prize Pool: $1,042,750
 Number of Payouts: 52

APPT Macao
 Casino: Casino Grand Lisboa
 Buy-in: 37,600+2,400 HKD (5,160 USD)
 6-Day Event: May 18–23, 2010
 Number of buy-ins: 342
 Total Prize Pool: $1,639,372
 Number of Payouts: 40

APPT Auckland
 Casino: Skycity Casino
 Buy-in: 3,250 NZD  ($2,275)
 5-Day Event: Sep 15-19, 2010
 Number of buy-ins: 218
 Total Prize Pool: NZ$654,000
 Number of Payouts: 24

APPT Cebu
 Casino: Shangri-La Mactan Resort & Spa
 Buy-in: 100,000 PHP (2,165 USD)
 5-Day Event: Nov 12-16, 2010
 Number of buy-ins: 239
 Total Prize Pool: PHP 21,518,480 (approx US$490,170)
 Number of Payouts: 28

APPT Sydney
 Casino: Star City Casino
 Buy-in: 6,300 A$ ($5,650)
 6-Day Event: Dec 7-12, 2010
 Number of buy-ins: 289
 Total Prize Pool: A$1,734,000
 Number of Payouts: 32

Notes

External links
Official site

Asia Pacific Poker Tour
2010 in poker